The U.S. state of Arizona first required its residents to register their motor vehicles in 1912. Registrants provided their own license plates for display until 1914, when the state began to issue plates.

Plates are currently issued by the Arizona Department of Transportation (ADOT) through its Motor Vehicle Division (MVD). Only rear plates have been required since 1989.

In Arizona, the license plate belongs to the vehicle owner. This allows for the transfer of a plate from one vehicle to another.

The current design was introduced in 1996 and was designed by Walter Punzmann.

Passenger baseplates

1914 to 1955

1956 to present
The 1955 (dated 1956) issue was the first Arizona license plate that complied with these standards.

County coding

Note: La Paz County was not formed until 1983, by which time the county-coding policy had ended.

Non-passenger plates

1997 to present

1980 to 1996

Optional plates
Arizona offers its motorists a number of optional issue designs that are available upon the payment of an additional fee. Below is a partial list.

Notes

References

External links
 Arizona license plates, 1969–present
 License Plates of Arizona
 Arizona License Plates

Arizona
Transportation in Arizona
Arizona transportation-related lists